This is a list of Kwakwaka'wakw villages.

adap'e, on Turnour Island
Ahta, Hata, or Hada, Ahta IR No. 3, on Bond Sound
Apsigiyu, on the northwest side of Gilford Island at the head of Shoal Harbour
Coal Harbour, Quatsino Sound
Gwayasdums, on Gilford Island
Hegams (Hopetown)
igisbalis, on the headland at Hoeya Sound, Knight Inlet
Kalugwis, on Turnour Island
Kamla, on Kumlah Island and Trafford Point on the east side of Gilford Island
K'omoks, In Comox
Gwa'yi, a.k.a. Okwunalis or Kingcome, 2 miles up the Kingcome from its mouth
Kingcome Inlet (Kwak'wala name unknown)
Klaywatse, on an island in the mouth of the Adam River (Vancouver Island)
Kliquit, on the north shore of Knight Inlet
Matilpi
Memkumlis, on Village Island
Metap, on Gilford Island
Nalakglala, at the head of Hoeya Sound, Knight Inlet
Paas or Ba'as (Blunden Harbour)
ʦax̱is (Fort Rupert)
Tzatsisnukomi (New Vancouver)
Wakhanaq, on the north side of Gilford Island
Waluk, on the south shore of the head of Kingcome Inlet
xudzedzalis (on Port Neville)
Whulk or xwalkw, also known as Cheslakees, at the mouth of the Nimpkish River
Yalis (Alert Bay IR No. 1)
Zalidis, near Glendale Cove

See also
List of Indian reserves in British Columbia
List of Nuxalk villages
List of Haida villages

References

External links
Kwakwaka'wakw communities, LanguageGeek website

Kwakwaka'wakw villages
Central Coast of British Columbia